Michael Thomas Claude Barnard (27 September 1942 – 11 December 1999) was an Australian politician. He was a member of the Tasmanian House of Assembly from 1969 to 1984, representing Bass for the Labor Party. He was Deputy Premier under two Labor Premiers, Doug Lowe and Harry Holgate from 1980 to 1982, and a long-standing Minister for Tourism (1975–82) and Health (1977–80).

Barnard had numerous family political connections. He was the grandson of Claude Barnard and the nephew of Lance Barnard, who both served in the Australian House of Representatives as federal members for Bass. Claude Barnard had also held the state seat of Bass in the 1950s. Michael Barnard's retirement in 1984 ended the Barnard family's representation in Tasmanian and Australian politics.

References

External links 

1942 births
1999 deaths
Deputy Premiers of Tasmania
Members of the Tasmanian House of Assembly
Australian Labor Party members of the Parliament of Tasmania
Politicians from Launceston, Tasmania
20th-century Australian politicians